Vijay Saxena (1 January 1968 - 24 June 1994) was a former Indian actor, who primarily worked in Hindi films from 1990 to 1994. He was famous for his resemblance with Bollywood superstar Amitabh Bachchan, which allowed him to act in Hindi movies as a hero. Saxena died in a car accident in 1994. His real name is Mintu Paul.

Career
Saxena initially worked in the crew of various films as a spotboy. Prior to this, he did a B. A. in Hindi. He made his film debut in Mithun Chakraborty starrer Swarg Yahan Narak Yahan. He also appeared in the parody film Ramgarh Ke Sholay (1991), which was inspired by Sholay (1975). The film also had other look-alike actors; Navin Rathod of Anil Kapoor, Anand Kumar of Govinda and Kishore Bhanushali of Dev Anand. He was paired opposite Sudha Chandran in Aakhri Chetawani. He was signed by a top director of Bollywood at the time of his death in 1994.

Filmography

References

External links
 

1968 births
Male actors from Assam
Male actors in Hindi cinema
People from Dhubri district
1994 deaths
Road incident deaths in India
Place of birth missing
20th-century Indian male actors
Amitabh Bachchan imitators